Stefan Olof "Stan" Saanila (born 27 June 1968 in Helsinki) is a Finnish stand-up comedian. He was one of the team captains, opposite novelist Jari Tervo, in the television show Uutisvuoto, filling a vacancy left when longtime captain Tommy Tabermann stepped down in order to run for a place in the Parliament of Finland in 2007. Following Tabermann's election into the Parliament and his 2010 death, Saanila has continued as captain.

Saanila is also known for his work in other programs, such as W-tyyli and Hetimiten, and he had a role in the movie Miehen työ (2007).

References

1968 births
Living people
Swedish-speaking Finns
Finnish stand-up comedians
Finnish television personalities